Farrokhabad-e Olya (also Romanized as Farrokhābād-e ‘Olyā; also known as Farrokhābād and Fakhrābād) is a village in Gol Gol Rural District, in the Central District of Kuhdasht County, Lorestan Province, Iran. At the 2006 census, its population was 237, in 44 families.

References 

Towns and villages in Kuhdasht County